General American English, known in linguistics simply as General American (abbreviated GA or GenAm), is the umbrella accent of American English spoken by a majority of Americans, encompassing a continuum rather than a single unified accent. In the United States it is often perceived as lacking any distinctly regional, ethnic, or socioeconomic characteristics, though Americans with high education, or from the North Midland, Western New England, and Western regions of the country are the most likely to be perceived as using General American speech. The precise definition and usefulness of the term continue to be debated, and the scholars who use it today admittedly do so as a convenient basis for comparison rather than for exactness. Other scholars prefer the term Standard American English.

Standard Canadian English accents are sometimes considered to fall under General American, especially in opposition to the United Kingdom's Received Pronunciation; in fact, typical Canadian English accents align with General American in nearly every situation where British and American accents differ.

Terminology

History and modern definition 
The term "General American" was first disseminated by American English scholar George Philip Krapp, who in 1925 described it as an American type of speech that was "Western" but "not local in character". In 1930, American linguist John Samuel Kenyon, who largely popularized the term, considered it equivalent to the speech of "the North" or "Northern American", but, in 1934, "Western and Midwestern". Now typically regarded as falling under the General American umbrella are the regional accents of the West, Western New England, and the North Midland (a band spanning central Ohio, central Indiana, central Illinois, northern Missouri, southern Iowa, and southeastern Nebraska), plus the accents of highly educated Americans nationwide. Arguably, all Canadian English accents west of Quebec are also General American, though Canadian vowel raising and certain newly developing features may serve to increasingly distinguish such accents from American ones. Similarly, William Labov et al.'s 2006 Atlas of North American English identified these three accent regions—the Western U.S., Midland U.S., and Canada—as sharing those pronunciation features whose convergence would form a hypothetical "General American" accent.

Regarded as having General American accents in the earlier 20th century, but not by the middle of the 20th century, are the Mid-Atlantic United States, the Inland Northern United States, and Western Pennsylvania. However, many younger speakers within these regions have reversed away from mid-20th century accent innovations back towards General American features. Accents that have never been labeled "General American", even since the term's popularization in the 1930s, are the regional accents (especially the r-dropping ones) of Eastern New England, New York City, and the American South. In 1982, British phonetician John C. Wells wrote that two-thirds of the American population spoke with a General American accent.

Disputed usage 

English-language scholar William A. Kretzchmar, Jr. explains in a 2004 article that the term "General American" came to refer to "a presumed most common or 'default' form of American English, especially to be distinguished from marked regional speech of New England or the South" and especially to speech associated with the vaguely-defined "Midwest", despite any historical or present evidence supporting this notion. Kretzschmar argues that a General American accent is simply the result of American speakers suppressing regional and social features that have become widely noticed and stigmatized.

Since calling one variety of American speech the "general" variety can imply privileging and prejudice, Kretzchmar instead promotes the term Standard American English, which he defines as a level of American English pronunciation "employed by educated speakers in formal settings", while still being variable within the U.S. from place to place, and even from speaker to speaker. However, the term "standard" may also be interpreted as problematically implying a superior or "best" form of speech. The terms Standard North American English and General North American English, in an effort to incorporate Canadian speakers under the accent continuum, have also been suggested by sociolinguist Charles Boberg. Since the 2000s, Mainstream American English has also been occasionally used, particularly in scholarly articles that contrast it against African-American English.

Modern language scholars discredit the original notion of General American as a single unified accent, or a standardized form of English—except perhaps as used by television networks and other mass media. Today, the term is understood to refer to a continuum of American speech, with some slight internal variation, but otherwise characterized by the absence of "marked" pronunciation features: those perceived by Americans as strongly indicative of a fellow American speaker's regional origin, ethnicity, or socioeconomic status. Despite confusion arising from the evolving definition and vagueness of the term "General American" and its consequent rejection by some linguists, the term persists mainly as a reference point to compare a baseline "typical" American English accent with other Englishes around the world (for instance, see Comparison of General American and Received Pronunciation).

Origins

Regional origins
Though General American accents are not commonly perceived as associated with any region, their sound system does have traceable regional origins: specifically, the English of the non-coastal Northeastern United States in the very early twentieth century. This includes western New England and the area to its immediate west, settled by members of the same dialect community: interior Pennsylvania, Upstate New York, and the adjacent "Midwest" or Great Lakes region. However, since the early to middle twentieth century, deviance away from General American sounds started occurring, and may be ongoing, in the eastern Great Lakes region due to its Northern Cities Vowel Shift (NCVS) towards a unique Inland Northern accent (often now associated with the region's urban centers, like Chicago and Detroit) and in the western Great Lakes region towards a unique North Central accent (often associated with Minnesota, Wisconsin, and North Dakota).

Theories about prevalence
Linguists have proposed multiple factors contributing to the popularity of a rhotic "General American" class of accents throughout the United States. Most factors focus on the first half of the twentieth century, though a basic General American pronunciation system may have existed even before the twentieth century, since most American English dialects have diverged very little from each other anyway, when compared to dialects of single languages in other countries where there has been more time for language change (such as the English dialects of England or German dialects of Germany).

One factor fueling General American's popularity was the major demographic change of twentieth-century American society: increased suburbanization, leading to less mingling of different social classes and less density and diversity of linguistic interactions. As a result, wealthier and higher-educated Americans' communications became more restricted to their own demographic. This, alongside their new marketplace that transcended regional boundaries (arising from the century's faster transportation methods), reinforced a widespread belief that highly educated Americans should not possess a regional accent. A General American sound, then, originated from both suburbanization and suppression of regional accent by highly educated Americans in formal settings. A second factor was a rise in immigration to the Great Lakes area (one native region of supposed "General American" speech) following the region's rapid industrialization period after the American Civil War, when this region's speakers went on to form a successful and highly mobile business elite, who traveled around the country in the mid-twentieth century, spreading the high status of their accents. A third factor is that various sociological (often race- and class-based) forces repelled socially-conscious Americans away from accents negatively associated with certain minority groups, such as African Americans and poor white communities in the South and with Southern and Eastern European immigrant groups (for example, Jewish communities) in the coastal Northeast. Instead, socially-conscious Americans settled upon accents more prestigiously associated with White Anglo-Saxon Protestant communities in the remainder of the country: namely, the West, the Midwest, and the non-coastal Northeast.

Kenyon, author of American Pronunciation (1924) and pronunciation editor for the second edition of Webster's New International Dictionary (1934), was influential in codifying General American pronunciation standards in writing. He used as a basis his native Midwestern (specifically, northern Ohio) pronunciation. Kenyon's home state of Ohio, however, far from being an area of "non-regional" accents, has emerged now as a crossroads for at least four distinct regional accents, according to late twentieth-century research. Furthermore, Kenyon himself was vocally opposed to the notion of any superior variety of American speech.

In the media 
General American, like the British Received Pronunciation (RP) and prestige accents of many other societies, has never been the accent of the entire nation, and, unlike RP, does not constitute a homogeneous national standard. Starting in the 1930s, nationwide radio networks adopted non-coastal Northern U.S. rhotic pronunciations for their "General American" standard. The entertainment industry similarly shifted from a non-rhotic standard to a rhotic one in the late 1940s, after the triumph of the Second World War, with the patriotic incentive for a more wide-ranging and unpretentious "heartland variety" in television and radio.

General American is thus sometimes associated with the speech of North American radio and television announcers, promoted as prestigious in their industry, where it is sometimes called "Broadcast English" "Network English", or "Network Standard". Instructional classes in the United States that promise "accent reduction", "accent modification", or "accent neutralization" usually attempt to teach General American patterns. Television journalist Linda Ellerbee states that "in television you are not supposed to sound like you're from anywhere", and political comedian Stephen Colbert says he consciously avoided developing a Southern American accent in response to media portrayals of Southerners as stupid and uneducated.

Phonology 
Typical General American accent features (for example, in contrast to British English) include features that concern consonants, such as rhoticity (full pronunciation of all  sounds), T-glottalization (with satin pronounced , not ), T- and D-flapping (with metal and medal pronounced the same, as ), L-velarization (with filling pronounced , not ), yod-dropping after alveolar consonants (with new pronounced , not ), as well as features that concern vowel sounds, such as various vowel mergers before  (so that Mary, marry, and merry are all commonly pronounced the same), raising of pre-voiceless  (with price and bright using a higher vowel sound than prize and bride), raising and gliding of pre-nasal  (with man having a higher and tenser vowel sound than map), the weak vowel merger (with affected and effected often pronounced the same), and at least one of the  vowel mergers (the – merger is complete among most Americans and the – merger among nearly half). All of these phenomena are explained in further detail under American English's phonology section. The following provides all the General American consonant and vowel sounds.

Consonants 
A table containing the consonant phonemes is given below:

Vowels 

Phonetically, the vowels of GA are short  when they precede the fortis consonants  within the same syllable and long  elsewhere. (Listen to the minimal pair of  ) This applies to all vowels but the schwa  (which is typically very short ), so when e.g.  is realized as a diphthong , it has the same allophones as the other diphthongs, whereas the sequence  (which corresponds to the  vowel  in RP) has the same allophones as phonemic monophthongs: short  before fortis consonants and long  elsewhere. The short  is also used for the sequence  (the  vowel). All unstressed vowels are also shorter than the stressed ones, and the more unstressed syllables follow a stressed one, the shorter it is, so that  in lead is noticeably longer than in leadership. (See Stress and vowel reduction in English.)
  are considered to compose a natural class of tense monophthongs in General American, especially for speakers with the cot–caught merger. The class manifests in how GA speakers treat loanwords, as in the majority of cases stressed syllables of foreign words are assigned one of these six vowels, regardless of whether the original pronunciation has a tense or a lax vowel. An example of that is the surname of Thomas Mann, which is pronounced with the tense  rather than lax  (as in RP, which mirrors the German pronunciation , which also has a lax vowel). All of the tense vowels except  and  can have either monophthongal or diphthongal pronunciations (i.e.  vs ). Monophthongal realizations are also possible, most commonly in unstressed syllables; here are audio examples for potato  and window . Even the diphthongal pronunciations themselves vary between the very narrow (i.e. ) and somewhat wider (i.e. ), with the former being more common.  varies between back  and central . As indicated in above phonetic transcriptions,  is subject to the same variation, but its mean phonetic value is usually somewhat less central than in modern RP.
See the chart for comparison to other dialects.

 Before dark  in a syllable coda,  and sometimes also  are realized as centering diphthongs .
Therefore,  is not a true phoneme in General American but merely a different notation of  preserved for when this phoneme precedes  and is stressed—a convention adopted in literature to facilitate comparisons with other accents. Furthermore, some analyze  as an allophone of  that surfaces when stressed, so ,  and  may be considered to be in complementary distribution and thus comprising one phoneme.
 In contemporary General American, the phonetic quality of  may be a back vowel , an advanced back vowel  , or the same as in RP, i.e. a central vowel .

The 2006 Atlas of North American English surmises that "if one were to recognize a type of North American English to be called 'General American'" according to data measurements of vowel pronunciations, "it would be the configuration formed by these three" dialect regions: Canada, the American West, and the American Midland. The following charts (as well as the one above) present the vowels that these three dialects encompass as a perceived General American sound system.

Pure vowels

Diphthongs

R-colored vowels

See also 

 List of dialects of the English language
 List of English words from indigenous languages of the Americas
 Accent reduction
 African-American English
 American English
 California English
 Chicano English
 English phonology
 English-language spelling reform
 Hawaiian Pidgin
 Northern Cities Vowel Shift
 Received Pronunciation
 Regional vocabularies of American English
 Standard Written English
 Transatlantic accent

References

Citations

Bibliography

Further reading

External links 

 Comparison with other English accents around the world

American English
Standard languages
Standard English